is a town located in Kagawa Prefecture, Japan. , the town had an estimated population of 26,449 in 10963 households and a population density of 270 persons per km².

Geography
Miki is located in eastern Kagawa Prefecture on ten island of Shikoku. The town area is long from north to south, and consists of hilly areas in the north, plains in the center, and mountainous areas in the south. It borders  the prefectural capital, Takamatsu City,  to the north, west, and southwest, Sanuki City to the east, and Mima City, Tokushima Prefecture to the southeast. From the northern part to the central and southern part, it is the basin of the Shinkawa River system, which originates from Mt. Kosen.

Neighbouring municipalities 
Kagawa Prefecture
Takamatsu
Sanuki
Tokushima Prefecture
Mima

Climate
Miki has a Humid subtropical climate (Köppen Cfa) characterized by warm summers and cool winters with light snowfall.  The average annual temperature in Miki is 15.3 °C. The average annual rainfall is 1606 mm with September as the wettest month. The temperatures are highest on average in January, at around 26.2 °C, and lowest in January, at around 5.0 °C.

Demographics
Per Japanese census data, the population of Utazu has been increasing steadily since the 1960s.

History 
The area of Miki was part of ancient Sanuki Province.  During the Edo Period, the area was part of the holdings of Takamatsu. Following the Meiji restoration, the area was organized into villages with the creation of the modern municipalities system on February 15, 1890. The village of Hirai was raised to town status on April 1, 1919. The town of Miki was created on October 1, 1954 by merging the town of Hirai and the villages of Hikami, Kamiyama, Shimotakaoka and Tanaka. In 1956 the village of Ido also merged into Miki, but in 1959 residents in the northern part of Ido requested their portion be transferred to the town of Nagao (present-day Sanuki city).

Government
Miki has a mayor-council form of government with a directly elected mayor and a unicameral town council of 16 members. Miki contributes one member to the Kagawa Prefectural Assembly. In terms of national politics, the town is part of Kagawa 2nd district  of the lower house of the Diet of Japan.

Economy
The local economy is based on admixture of agriculture (rice, strawberries, asparagus, tomatoes, and other agricultural products), food processing and light manufacturing.

Education
Miki has four public elementary schools and one public middle school operated by the town government, and one public high school operated by the Kagawa Prefectural Board of Education.

Transportation

Railways 
 Takamatsu-Kotohira Electric Railroad Kotoden Nagao Line
  -  -  -  -  -  -

Highways 
  Takamatsu Expressway

References

External links

Miki official website  (English version)

Towns in Kagawa Prefecture
Miki, Kagawa